The 1997 Seattle Seahawks season was the team's 22nd season with the National Football League (NFL). This season would mark a new era for the Seahawks as they drafted two first round picks (Shawn Springs and Walter Jones) and traded quarterback Rick Mirer and signed Minnesota Vikings/Houston Oilers quarterback Warren Moon to be John Friesz's backup. Moon and Jones would go on to be selected to the Pro Football Hall of Fame in 2006 and 2014, respectively. They also signed rookie quarterback Jon Kitna. After a Week 1 injury to Friesz, Moon led the Seahawks improvement from 1996's 7–9 record to finish 8–8. This would be Moon's last season making the Pro Bowl in his career, he went on to win Pro Bowl MVP.

This season is notable for being the first under new owner Microsoft co-founder Paul Allen. Allen helped keep the team from relocating and made sure it remained in Seattle.

NFL draft

Personnel

Staff

Final roster

     Starters in bold.
 (*) Denotes players that were selected for the 1998 Pro Bowl.

Schedule

Preseason

Source: Seahawks Media Guides

Regular season
Divisional matchups have the AFC West playing the NFC West.

Bold indicates division opponents.
Source: 1997 NFL season results

Standings

Game Summaries

Preseason

Week P1: vs. Minnesota Vikings

Week P2: vs. Arizona Cardinals

Week P3: at San Francisco 49ers

Week P4: vs. Indianapolis Colts

Week P5: at Cincinnati Bengals

Regular season

Week 1: vs. New York Jets

Week 2: vs. Denver Broncos

Week 3: at Indianapolis Colts

Week 4: vs. San Diego Chargers

Week 5: at Kansas City Chiefs

Week 6: vs. Tennessee Oilers

Week 8: at St. Louis Rams

Week 9: vs. Oakland Raiders

Week 10 at Denver Broncos

Week 11: at San Diego Chargers

Week 12: at New Orleans Saints

Week 13: vs. Kansas City Chiefs

Week 14: vs. Atlanta Falcons

Week 15: at Baltimore Ravens

This was the first time the Seahawks had ever played a regular season game in Baltimore against either the Colts or the Ravens.

Week 16: at Oakland Raiders

Week 17: vs. San Francisco 49ers

Awards and records
 Warren Moon, Pro Bowl MVP Award

References

External links
 Seahawks draft history at NFL.com
 1997 draft at HickokSports.com
 1997 NFL season results at NFL.com

Seattle
Seattle Seahawks seasons
Seattle